In mathematics, a quadratic-linear algebra is an algebra over a field with a presentation such that all relations are sums of monomials of degrees 1 or 2 in the generators. An example is the universal enveloping algebra of a Lie algebra, with generators a basis of the Lie algebra and relations of the form XY – YX – [X, Y] = 0.

References

Algebra